O'Bannon Creek is a stream in St. Francois County in the U.S. state of Missouri. It is a tributary of the St. Francis River.

O'Bannon Creek has the name of a pioneer citizen.

See also
List of rivers of Missouri

References

Rivers of St. Francois County, Missouri
Rivers of Missouri